The Wolffkran Open is a professional tennis tournament played on indoor carpet courts. It is currently part of the Association of Tennis Professionals (ATP) Challenger Tour. It is held annually in Ismaning, Germany since 2017.

Past finals

Singles

Doubles

External links
 Official website

 
ATP Challenger Tour
Carpet court tennis tournaments
Tennis tournaments in Germany
Recurring sporting events established in 2017